Srabanti Chowdhury is an Indian-American Electrical Engineer who is an associate professor of electrical engineering at Stanford University. She is a senior fellow of the Precourt Institute for Energy. At Stanford she works on ultra-wide and wide-bandgap semiconductors and device engineering for energy-efficient electronic devices. She serves as Director for Science Collaborations at the United States Department of Energy Energy Frontier Research Center ULTRA.

Early life and education 
Chowdhury earned her bachelor's degree in radiophysics and electronics at the University of Calcutta Institute of Radiophysics and Electronics. After earning her undergraduate degree, she worked in the corporate sector in Bangalore. She eventually decided to pursue a doctorate, and moved to the United States. She was a graduate student at the University of California, Santa Barbara, where she worked alongside Umesh Mishra. During her doctoral research, she developed vertical gallium nitride (GaN) devices for power conversion. She was the first to realize a current aperture vertical electron transistor, a high voltage vertical power switching device based on  GaN. These single crystal GaN devices achieved a record-high breakdown electric field. After earning her doctorate, she joined Transphorm, a company that looked to commercialize GaN devices.

Research and career 
Chowdhury leads the WBG Lab at Stanford University.
Chowdhury dedicated her early research to the creation of very low loss transistors for power conversion applications. Building upon her doctoral research, she identified and optimized fabrication processes to create GaN vertical devices. Her fabrication makes use of the interesting polarization characteristics of GaN. Reverse polarization of Aluminum Gallium Nitride/GaN heterostructure blocks current, whilst allowing very high current flow to specific regions. Her work offers hope for high power density, high efficiency electronic devices. Alongside GaN, Chowdhury has investigated diamond for passive electronics.

Chowdhury serves as Director for Science Collaborations at the United States Department of Energy Energy Frontier Research Center ULTRA (Ultra Materials for a Resilient, Smart Electricity Grid).

Awards and honors 
 DARPA Young Faculty Award
 National Science Foundation CAREER Award
 AFOSR Young Investigator Program
 International Symposium on Compound Semiconductors Young Scientist Award
 Sloan Research Fellowship
 National Academy of Engineering Frontiers of Engineering

Selected publications

References 

American academics of Indian descent
21st-century Indian scholars
Stanford University Department of Electrical Engineering faculty
Living people

Year of birth missing (living people)
University of Calcutta alumni
University of California, Santa Barbara alumni
Arizona State University faculty
University of California, Davis faculty